Stefan Karlsson (born 15 December 1988) is a Swedish former footballer who played as a defender.

Career

Karlsson started his career in Växjö Norra. He played with Öster between 2008 and 2013 and was part of taking the team from third-tier Division 1 to top-tier Allsvenskan.

Karlsson joined Djurgården in January 2014.

In July 2016 Karlsson joined Östersunds FK, and played the remaining games that season for them before joining Jönköpings Södra in January 2017.

In January 2018, Karlsson signed a 3-year contract with his old club Östers IF.

References

External links
 
 Eliteprospects profile
 

1988 births
Living people
People from Haninge Municipality
Association football defenders
Östers IF players
Djurgårdens IF Fotboll players
Jönköpings Södra IF players
Östersunds FK players
Allsvenskan players
Superettan players
Swedish footballers
Sportspeople from Stockholm County